Non Din Daeng is the southwesternmost district (amphoe) of Buriram province, northeastern Thailand.

Geography
Neighboring districts are (from the north clockwise) Pakham, Lahan Sai of Buriram Province, Ta Phraya, Watthana Nakhon of Sa Kaeo province and Soeng Sang of Nakhon Ratchasima province.

The Sankamphaeng Range mountainous area is in the southern section of this district.

History
The minor district (king amphoe) Non Din Daeng was created on 31 May 1993, when three tambons were split off from Lahan Sai district. It was upgraded to a full district on 5 December 1996.

Motto
The Non Din Daeng District's motto is "City of good people, Rao su ('we fight') monument, Prasat Nong Hong, forest and nature, Lamnangrong Dam beach."

Administration
The district is divided into three sub-districts (tambons), which are further subdivided into 45 villages (mubans). Non Din Daeng is a township (thesaban tambon) which covers parts of tambons Non Din Daeng and Sompoi. There are also three tambon administrative organizations (TAO).

References

External links
amphoe.com
 

Non Din Daeng